Robert Chenaux (born 29 November 1943) is a Puerto Rican former swimmer. He competed in the men's 400 metre freestyle at the 1960 Summer Olympics.

References

1943 births
Living people
Puerto Rican male swimmers
Olympic swimmers of Puerto Rico
Swimmers at the 1960 Summer Olympics
People from Río Piedras, Puerto Rico
Puerto Rican male freestyle swimmers
20th-century Puerto Rican people
21st-century Puerto Rican people